Delilah is the third studio album and first major label release by American musician Anderson East. The album was released on July 10, 2015 via Low Country Sound an imprint of Elektra.

Background
East stated that he chose the album name from Delilah, one of the characters in the seventh book of the Bible called Book of Judges, which features the famous story of Samson and Delilah. "Samson was like the strongest man alive. God blessed him with this superhuman strength but it all laid in his hair. He’s infatuated with [Delilah], totally in love with her, told her secrets and that was the crumbling of the strongest man that’s ever lived. That’s kind of the thread through the record: the woman that saved the crumbled man."

The George Jackson song, "Find 'Em, Fool 'Em and Forget 'Em" came from a visit to the FAME Studios, located in North Alabama, where the record was recorded. The album was recorded live there.

East co-wrote the song "Quit You" with singer-songwriter Chris Stapleton, who Dave Cobb worked with previously, and brought into the studio so the two could meet. They hit it off and wrote the song.

Critical reception
Critical reception was generally positive. Starpulse gave the album four stars. American Songwriter gave the album four out of five stars.

Track listing

References

2015 albums
Elektra Records albums
Albums produced by Dave Cobb